Super Cauldron is a scrolling platform game released by Titus Software in 1992.

Gameplay

Reception

Reviews were greatly mixed between magazine reviews of the game upon its release:
 In the July 1993 issue of CU Amiga reviewer John Mather gave it a 27%, calling a new version of the game as dull and tedious.
Amiga Format gave it a 70% rating.
Amiga Action gave it 63% rating.
Amiga Computing gave it an 80% rating.
Amiga Power gave it a 26% rating.
The One Amiga gave it a 59% rating. the first time it reviewed it, and then a 71% rating in an issue the next year.
Amstrad Action gave it a 96% rating.

References

External links
Super Cauldron at MobyGames

Amiga games
1992 video games
Amstrad CPC games
Atari ST games
DOS games
Fantasy video games
Side-scrolling platform games
Video games developed in France
Video games featuring female protagonists
Video games about witchcraft